500 dagar om året (500 days a year) is the 20th studio album by Swedish singer/songwriter Tomas Ledin, released in June 2009.

Album information

The album produced by Lasse Andersson, was recorded during the winter of 2008/2009 in Sweden. As usual, all songs were composed by Ledin himself, with some help by Lasse Andersson on the track "Håll ut". The song was eventually released as the first single from the album, peaking at number 42 on the Swedish Singles Chart in February 2009. The title track itself was also released on single before the actual album and became the album's biggest hit. In addition to peaking at number 16 on the official sales chart, it also became Tomas' first top5 hit on the Swedish radio chart Svensktoppen, since 1993.

The album itself was a huge success. Upon its release in June 2009, it entered the Swedish albums chart at number two and stayed in the top10 for eleven weeks. "500 dagar om året" was certified Platinum a month after its release, in early July.

In 2010, another track from the album managed to enter the Svensktoppen charts. In April, the album's closing number, "Kanske kvällens sista dans", peaked at number 10.

Track listing

Personnel
The following musicians contributed to the recording of "500 dagar om året":

Tomas Ledin: vocals, background vocals, acoustic guitar, high string guitar, harmonica
Lasse Andersson: electric guitar, piano, background vocals, percussion, acoustic guitar, drums
Sebastian Nylund: electric guitar
Jörgen Ingeström: hammond organ, piano
Ove Andersson: bass
Mikael Lyander: tambourine, percussion
Johan Franzon: drums

References

2009 albums
Tomas Ledin albums